The Baoguo Temple is a former Mahayana Buddhist temple located in the Jiangbei district,  north of Ningbo, in Zhejiang Province, People's Republic of China.  It is noted as the second oldest surviving wooden structure in southern China since the main hall of the present temple dates back to 1013 AD during The Northern Song Dynasty.

History
The temple was originally called the Lingshan Temple, but in 880 AD, during the Tang Dynasty it was renamed the Baoguo Temple. The main hall was rebuilt in 1013 AD, during the Northern Song dynasty, and is one of the oldest and most well preserved wooden constructions in China.  The temple also contains columns dating to the Tang Dynasty, a hall built during the Ming Dynasty, and two halls and towers of the Qing Dynasty.

Today the temple is no longer a temple but a tourist attraction, and many of its rooms and halls are used to house various exhibitions, including:
Guanyin statues
Confucian bronzes
Ningbo furniture
Traditional Chinese wedding attire
Carved stone screens
Miscellaneous architectural pieces from the temple compound
Famous places around China

Transport 
The temple can be accessed by bus 332 from Ningbo city.  The ride takes approximately 35 minutes.

See also
List of Buddhist temples
Major National Historical and Cultural Sites (Zhejiang)

External links

Baoguo Temple Official Website 
Baoguo Temple, English Description on Ningbo City Website
Baoguo Monastery, Architectura Sinica Site Archive

11th-century Buddhist temples
Buddhist temples in Ningbo
Song dynasty architecture
Major National Historical and Cultural Sites in Zhejiang
Timber framed buildings in China